Kelly Packard is the head women's basketball coach at Taylor University. Previously she served as head women's basketball coach at Ball State University. She served in that position for four seasons (2008–12) and moved into the position at Taylor in 2013. She is a former head coach of the Colorado Chill from the National Women's Basketball League. She previously served as an assistant coach at Colorado State University, where she helped the Rams to a 99-49 record. In 2004 and 2005, the Colorado Chill won the NWBL Championships.

She was a four year basketball player at Anderson University (Indiana), and is a member of the Anderson University Hall of Fame. Her 1990 records— scoring (1,275) and rebounds (723) stood until 2001, when they were broken by Rachel Miller.

In 2009, she coached the Cardinals to a 26–9 record, the best record in school history, including an NCAA Tournament first-round upset of national power the University of Tennessee and head coach Pat Summitt. It was the first time in history that Summitt had been defeated in the first round. The Women's Basketball Coaches Association selected Packard to receive the  Maggie Dixon Rookie Coach of the Year award for Division I coaches.

References

External links
Ball State University profile
Taylor University profile

Living people
Anderson University (Indiana) alumni
Ball State Cardinals women's basketball coaches
College women's basketball players in the United States
Colorado State Rams women's basketball coaches
American women's basketball coaches
Year of birth missing (living people)
Anderson Ravens and Lady Ravens athletes